Skatval is a former municipality in the old Nord-Trøndelag county, Norway. The  municipality existed from 1902 until its dissolution in 1962. The municipality encompassed the Skatval peninsula in the northwestern part of what is now the municipality of Stjørdal in Trøndelag county. The administrative centre was the village of Skatval where the Skatval Church is located. Other villages in the Skatval area include Auran, Kvithammer, and Steinvika.

Skatval is divided in several geographical parts listed here counterclockwise from north: Langstein, Nordbygda, Sørbygda, Midtbygda, and Vassbygda. The Skatval peninsula is an important farming area, belonging to the plain districts of Trøndelag. The mountaintop is a regional landmark.

History
The municipality of Skatval was established on 1 January 1902 when the old municipality of Nedre Stjørdal was dissolved and it was divided into three new municipalities: Lånke (population: 1,449), Skatval (population: 2,125), and Stjørdal (population: 3,158). During the 1960s, there were many municipal mergers across Norway due to the work of the Schei Committee. On 1 January 1962, the neighboring municipalities of Hegra (population: 2,704), Lånke (population: 1,967), Skatval (population: 1,944), and Stjørdal (population: 6,204) were all merged to form a new, larger municipality of Stjørdal.

Name
The municipality (originally the parish) is named after the old Skatval farm since the first Skatval Church was built there. This likely is referring to the fact that the local farms lie on a flat surface that juts out at an angle between valley depressions.

Government
While it existed, this municipality was responsible for primary education (through 10th grade), outpatient health services, senior citizen services, unemployment, social services, zoning, economic development, and municipal roads. During its existence, this municipality was governed by a municipal council of elected representatives, which in turn elected a mayor.

Mayors
The mayors of Skatval:

 1902–1907: John O. Arnstad (V)
 1908–1913: Ole Nikolai Wæhre (V)
 1914–1934: Karl Eidsvik (H/Bp)
 1934–1945: John Arnstad (Bp/NS)
 1945-1945: Peder J. Arnstad (Bp)
 1946–1947: Peter Aune (V)
 1948–1961: Peder J. Arnstad (Bp)

Municipal council
The municipal council  of Skatval was made up of 21 representatives that were elected to four year terms. The party breakdown of the final municipal council was as follows:

See also
List of former municipalities of Norway

References

Stjørdal
Former municipalities of Norway
1902 establishments in Norway
1962 disestablishments in Norway